The 1630s BC was a decade lasting from January 1, 1639 BC to December 31, 1630 BC.

Events and trends
 1633 BC—May 2—Lunar Saros 34 begins.
Before 1630 BC – 1500 BC—Landscape (Spring fresco), wall painting with areas of modern reconstruction from Akrotiri, Thera, Cyclades, is made. It is now at National Archaeological Museum, Athens.

Significant people
 1637 BC—Death of Abraham according to Jewish calculations (2,123 years after biblical creation)
 1634 BC—Death of Salah, son of Arpachshad, according to the Hebrew calendar

References